Bernard Pardo (born 19 December 1960) is a former professional footballer who played for a number of clubs in the French Division 1 and for the France national team. In 1993, he was sent to jail for cocaine traffic, which interrupted his career.

Personal life
Pardo was born in France to a French father and an Armenian mother.

Honours
Marseille
 French Division 1: 1990–91
 European Cup: runner-up 1990–91

References

External links
 
 
 

1960 births
Living people
French footballers
Association football midfielders
France international footballers
French people of Armenian descent
US Boulogne players
Lille OSC players
Stade Brestois 29 players
AS Saint-Étienne players
SC Toulon players
FC Girondins de Bordeaux players
Olympique de Marseille players
Paris Saint-Germain F.C. players
Ligue 1 players
Ligue 2 players